Anawal  is a village in the southern state of Karnataka, India. It is located in the Badami taluk of Bagalkot district in Karnataka.

See also
 Bagalkot
 Districts of Karnataka

References

External links

Villages in Bagalkot district